SelectUSA is a summit held by the U.S. Department of Commerce's International Trade Administration to promote foreign direct investment to the United States, the only such U.S. effort at the federal level. Predecessor of SelectUSA, namely Invest in America, was founded in 2007, and renamed as its current title in 2011.

On March 7, 2007, Invest in America was established in the International Trade Administration to promote the United States as a destination for inward direct investment, also known as foreign direct investment.  Invest in America is the primary U.S. Government mechanism to manage foreign direct investment promotion. Efforts are focused on outreach to foreign governments and investors, support for state governments’ investment promotion efforts, and addressing business climate concerns by serving as ombudsman in Washington for the international investment community.

Invest in America reinforces the longstanding U.S. Open Investment Policy. Through Invest in America, the Department of Commerce promotes the U.S. economy as the best place in the world to do business.

Mission
According to the Invest in America website, Invest in America promotes and supports foreign direct investment in the United States, contributing to U.S. job creation, innovation, and competitiveness.

Activities
Policy: Invest in America endeavors to bolster the global competitiveness of the United States economy by addressing policy issues that concern foreign investors. In November 2007, Invest in America published a policy paper entitled, “Visas and Foreign Direct Investment.”  In addition to raising awareness of this issue, Invest in America is now actively engaged with stakeholders to address specific challenges raised in this paper. In October 2008, Invest in America released its second policy paper on "U.S. Litigation Environment and FDI."

Ombudsman: Invest in America serves as ombudsman in Washington, D.C. for the international investment community, working across the Federal Government to act as a voice to address investor concerns and issues involving Federal agencies. Invest in America receives inquiries from potential and current foreign investors with regard to issues encountered within the Federal bureaucracy.

Promotion: Invest in America promotes investment in the United States by highlighting the advantages of investing in the United States, and countering the misconceptions some investors may have. Invest in America meets regularly with both domestic and international stakeholders and organizes events such as "Invest in America Week." The Department of Commerce’s global network provides the platform to educate international investors on the advantages that come with investing in the United States. According to the Invest in America website, Invest in America welcomes all inquiries and is equipped to serve as a foreign investor’s first point of contact for an investment in the United States.

State Cooperation: Invest in America serves a federal complement to existing U.S. state efforts. Invest in America complements state efforts, but remains neutral in any competition between them. Invest in America promotes the United States, not specific states, as the premier site for foreign direct investment. Invest in America can provide all potential investors an investment contact list encompassing all fifty States, the District of Columbia, and U.S. territories. This guide provides the economic development point of contact within each state who has been designated by each Governor to field international investment inquiries.

References

External links 
Invest in America website
Open Economies Policy Statement

Investment promotion agencies
United States Department of Commerce
Foreign direct investment
Investment in the United States
Defunct agencies of the United States government
2007 establishments in the United States
Summits